In taxonomy, Thalassobius is a genus of the Rhodobacteraceae.

References

Further reading

Scientific journals

Scientific books

Scientific databases

External links

Bacteria genera
Rhodobacteraceae